Stanisław Bukowski (3 January 1923 – 19 January 2002) was a Polish cross-country skier. He competed at the 1948 Winter Olympics and the 1956 Winter Olympics.

References

1923 births
2002 deaths
Polish male cross-country skiers
Olympic cross-country skiers of Poland
Cross-country skiers at the 1948 Winter Olympics
Cross-country skiers at the 1956 Winter Olympics
Sportspeople from Zakopane